Grevillea leptopoda is a species of flowering plant in the family Proteaceae and is endemic to the south-west of Western Australia. It is a spreading to erect shrub with divided leaves, the lobes further divided, the end lobes linear, and clusters of white to cream-coloured flowers.

Description

Taxonomy
Grevillea leptopoda was first formally described in 1986 by Donald McGillivray in his New Names in Grevillea (Proteaceae) from specimens collected near the Brand Highway north of Carnamah in 1953. The specific epithet (leptopoda) means "slender foot", referring to the thin flower pedicels.

Distribution and habitat
This grevillea is found from Kalbarri south to Moora, growing among medium to low trees in tall shrubland, mallee or heathland It will grow in rocky, stony or sandy lateritic soils.

Conservation status
Grevillea leptopoda is listed as "Priority Three" by the Government of Western Australia Department of Biodiversity, Conservation and Attractions, meaning that it is poorly known and known from only a few locations but is not under imminent threat.

Use in horticulture
This species has heavily scented flowers and is used in domestic gardens in warmer areas.

See also
 List of Grevillea species

References

leptopoda
Eudicots of Western Australia
Proteales of Australia
Taxa named by Donald McGillivray
Plants described in 1986